Johann Malawana is a British doctor, social entrepreneur and founder of The Healthcare Leadership Academy and Medics.Academy. Malawana formerly practised as an obstetrician and was Chair of the British Medical Association's (BMA) Junior Doctors Committee from September 2015 to July 2016. Malawana's leadership of the BMA Junior Doctors Committee occurred during the 2015 junior doctors contract dispute in England, and he led junior doctors into industrial action, striking over pay and conditions for the first time since 1975.

Early life
Malawana grew up in Gants Hill, London and was educated at Ilford County High School. He studied at Barts and The London School of Medicine and Dentistry, graduating with a medical degree in 2005.

Career
Malawana was president of Barts and The London Students' Association 2002–03.

In 2003–05 he was University of London Union Medical Students Officer and founded the London Medical Student newspaper as part of the campaign around Modernising Medical Careers.

In 2004 he was elected the Deputy Chair for Education of the BMA Medical Students Committee.

He was an appointed member of the Postgraduate Medical Education and Training Board (PMETB) 2008–10 and the General Medical Council (GMC) 2009–12.

From 2007 to 2010, after the introduction of Modernising Medical Careers and the MTAS debacle, he was elected as the BMA Junior Doctors Committee Chair of the Education and Training team. As part of the subsequent negotiations, he is credited with devising the first version of the Interdeanery Transfer system.

At the end of September 2015, he was elected chair of the BMA Junior Doctors Committee. A contract dispute began to unfold during that time, affecting junior doctors in England. In November 2015, he was named by the Health Service Journal to be the 78th most influential person in the English NHS.

Malawana resigned from the position of chair of the BMA Junior Doctors Committee on 5 July 2016.

Malawana founded The Healthcare Leadership Academy in 2016 to help healthcare students and young professionals develop their leadership skills. Malawana's work throughout his career focussed on developing early stage doctors and health professionals. He voiced concerns about the 'poisonous political atmosphere' that he alleges had been created in the NHS, and responded with the creation of The Healthcare Leadership Academy (The HLA). This was intended as a way to help early stage career professionals to prepare to lead healthcare organisations globally through a new model of leadership training. The HLA programme involves project based learning. The Healthcare Leadership Academy has expanded from 13 healthcare students and professionals (known as 'scholars') in London, and now operates from four different cities, and welcomes scholars from across Europe. Admission to the programme is recognised as a prestigious accolade.

Malawana founded Medics.Academy in 2016, a technology company looking to contribute solutions to the workforce crisis in healthcare through innovative technology enhanced learning products. Products developed by the Medics.Academy team include The Healthcare Leadership Academy, F|Docs and Nucleus.

Personal life
He is married to a GP, with whom he has two sons. He previously ran a photography business in his spare time.

References

British obstetricians
21st-century English medical doctors
Living people
People educated at Ilford County High School
Alumni of Barts and The London School of Medicine and Dentistry
British trade unionists
People from Gants Hill
Year of birth missing (living people)